Alex Cameron (born 11 September 1988) is an Australian singer-songwriter from Sydney. He is best known for his solo career, a high-concept act in which Cameron initially adopted the persona of a failed entertainer. During live performances, Cameron is often joined by saxophonist and "business partner", Roy Molloy. Before making music under his own name, Cameron was also a member of the electronica act Seekae, releasing three studio albums with them. 

Cameron independently released his debut album, Jumping the Shark, for free on his website in 2013. In 2016, Secretly Canadian reissued the album to a wider audience and growing cult fanbase. In 2017, Cameron released his second studio album, Forced Witness, featuring contributions from Molloy, Flowers, Olsen and Jonathan Rado. His third studio album, Miami Memory, was released in September 2019. His fourth studio album, Oxy Music, was released in March 2022.

Career

2013–2016: Jumping the Shark
Regarding his adopted persona of that of a failed musician, Cameron notes, "I write about the outlier, the table-for-one guy, the guy whose life is a constellation of microscopic tragedies. Failure has been underexplored in music. My characters come from a place where ambition, crippling self-doubt and tragedy intersect."

After releasing his debut album, Jumping the Shark, for free on his website, and physically through Siberia Records, Cameron attracted the attention of indie rock duo Foxygen while performing at David Lynch's Parisian club, Silencio. Cameron toured extensively with Mac DeMarco, Kevin Morby, Unknown Mortal Orchestra and Angel Olsen in the ensuing years. While on tour with Morby in April 2016, the label Secretly Canadian announced they had signed Cameron and would be re-releasing Jumping the Shark in August 2016. Upon the announcement, Cameron issued the following statement: "Its 2016 [sic], and its time for Alex Cameron. Entertainer. Showman. Shaman. Side by side with his business partner and saxophonist, Roy Molloy, the duo are a living and breathing story of success told through the internet; unedited, unscripted, and, up until now, to a dedicated audience of no one. Thanks to the good people at Secretly Canadian that is about to change."

2017–2018: Forced Witness
In 2017, Cameron released his second studio album, Forced Witness, a departure from the mostly-electronic sound of his debut album, the album was produced by Foxygen's Jonathan Rado, and features a full-band production, including saxophonist Roy Molloy. That same year, Cameron co-wrote five tracks on The Killers' fifth studio album, Wonderful Wonderful, with frontman Brandon Flowers appearing on the closing track of Forced Witness, "Politics of Love".

The album's accompanying tour found Cameron fronting a full band – including Molloy, keyboardist Holiday Sidewinder, guitarist Justin Nijssen – and supporting The Killers on their UK and US arena tour.

On 26 September 2018, Cameron and Molloy hosted a 24-hour telethon via Instagram, Twitter, and Facebook Live with the express goal to "save the music industry and pad our pantry out by selling 1000 records in 24 hours," which they succeeded in doing.

2019–2020: Miami Memory
On 18 June 2019, Cameron announced his third studio album, Miami Memory. The album was released on 13 September 2019 via Secretly Canadian. For the album's accompanying tour, lead guitarist Lilah Larson joined Cameron's live band, replacing keyboard and backing vocalist Holiday Sidewinder, who left to focus on her solo career.

In 2020, Cameron co-wrote four songs on The Killers' sixth studio album, Imploding the Mirage, co-produced by Cameron's longtime producer Jonathan Rado. On May 8, 2020, Cameron released a single cover of the Paul Kelly song "Before Too Long".

2021–present: Oxy Music
In July 2021, it was announced that Cameron would commence a European Tour in 2022 with Roy Molloy.

In November 2021, Cameron released "Sara Jo", the first single since 2019.

On 20 January 2022, Cameron announced his fourth studio album Oxy Music, to be released on 11 March 2022, and supported by a tour of North America and Europe. The album's second single, titled "Best Life", was released the same day accompanied by a music video directed by his wife Jemima Kirke. The album features Lloyd Vines and Sleaford Mods' Jason Williamson. The album was is inspired by the opioid epidemic and Nico Walker's novel Cherry. In its press release, Cameron explain: "The album is a story, a work of fiction, mostly from the perspective of a man. Starved of meaningful purpose, confused about the state of the world, and in dire need of a reason to live. This is one of those people."

Personal life
Cameron has been in a relationship with actress Jemima Kirke since July 2017. They married in November 2020 in a private ceremony.

Backing band
Current
Roy Molloy – saxophone, "business partner" (2012–present)
Justin Nijssen – bass guitar, guitar, backing vocals (2017–present)
Henri Lindström – drums, percussion (2017–present)
Tim Rogers – keyboards, guitar (occasional appearances; 2017–present)
Lilah Larson – lead guitar, backing vocals (2019–present)
Jess Parsons – keyboards, backing vocals (2019–present)

Former
Holiday Sidewinder – keyboards, backing vocals (2017–2019)
Lawrence Pike – drums (2018)

Discography

Studio albums

Live albums

EPs

Awards and nominations

APRA Awards
The APRA Awards are presented annually from 1982 by the Australasian Performing Right Association (APRA), "honouring composers and songwriters".

! 
|-
| 2018 
| "Strangers Kiss"
| Song of the Year
| 
| 
|-

Music videos

References

External links

Living people
21st-century Australian singers
Australian male singer-songwriters
Australian indie rock musicians
21st-century Australian male singers
Year of birth uncertain
1988 births
Secretly Canadian artists